Maculatifrondes is a genus of fungi in the order Phyllachorales. This is a monotypic genus, containing the single species Maculatifrondes aequatoriensis. The fungus, first discovered in Ecuador, is associated with leaf spot of palms.

References

External links

Fungi of South America
Phyllachorales
Monotypic Sordariomycetes genera